Jack Paris Pattison Cornick (born 24 November 1992) is an English former first-class cricketer.

Cornick was born at Nottingham in November 1992. He was educated at King Edward's School, Birmingham before going up to Loughborough University. While studying at Loughborough, he made two appearances in first-class cricket for Loughborough MCCU against Sussex and Hampshire in 2013. He struggled as a batsman against first-class county opposition, scoring just 11 runs with a high score of 10.

References

External links

1992 births
Living people
Cricketers from Nottingham
People educated at King Edward's School, Birmingham
Alumni of Loughborough University
English cricketers
Loughborough MCCU cricketers